The Prodi Commission was the European Commission in office between 1999 and 2004. The administration was led by former Italian Prime Minister Romano Prodi.

History
The commission took office on 16 September 1999 following the scandal and subsequent resignation of the Santer Commission which had damaged the reputation of the institution. The college consisted of 20 Commissioners which grew to 30 following the Enlargement of the European Union in 2004. It was the last commission to see two members allocated to the larger member states.

This commission (the 10th) saw in increase in power and influence following the Amsterdam Treaty. Some in the media described president Prodi as being the first "Prime Minister of the European Union".

As well as the enlargement and Amsterdam Treaty, the Prodi Commission also saw the signing and enforcement of the Nice Treaty as well as the conclusion and signing of the European Constitution: in which he introduced the "Convention method" of negotiation. From 1999 Prodi saw in the euro and by 2002 it came into cash form and the single currency for 12 of the EU's 15 member states. The body was however criticised for being lacklustre, with poor communication and failing to make an impact despite major events such as enlargement and the euro.

The commission was due to leave office on 31 October 2004, but due to opposition from the European parliament to the proposed Barroso Commission which would succeed it, it was extended and finally left office on 21 November 2004.

Commissioners

When the Commission took office in 1999, there were 20 Commissioners, one from each member state and two from the largest 5 states (Italy, France, Germany, Spain and the United Kingdom).

2004 saw 15 new Commissioners, 5 replacing existing Commissioners who had resigned before the end of their mandate and 10 from the new member states who joined in that year. Most of these Commissioners continued to serve in the following Barroso Commission.

The members from the new states shared a portfolio with an existing member, rather than creating new posts or having Commissioners (old or new) without a portfolio.

The following table indicates the number of Commissioners according to their political alignment at the start of the commission, those who joined from the new member states and the number when the Commission left office. The colours reflect those used in the table of Commissioners below.

By political affiliation

Initial College

New commissioners from 1 May 2004

See also
 Bolkestein Directive
 Treaty establishing a Constitution for Europe

External links
 President Prodi's Website
 Prodi Commission profiles, portfolios and homepages

References

 
European Commissions
1999 establishments in the European Union
2004 disestablishments in the European Union
Romano Prodi